Sela pri Volčah is a settlement on the right bank of the Soča River, southwest of Most na Soči, in the Municipality of Tolmin in the Littoral region of Slovenia.

Name
The name of the settlement was changed from Sela to Sela pri Volčah in 1955.

References

External links
Sela pri Volčah on Geopedia

Populated places in the Municipality of Tolmin